A 9(1)(h) order is an order issued by the Canadian Radio-television and Telecommunications Commission (CRTC) pursuant to section 9(1)(h) of Canada's Broadcasting Act. It requires that a particular Canadian television channel be distributed by all (or a particular subset of) cable, satellite, IPTV, or similar subscription-based television service providers in Canada. In most (but not all) cases, the order requires that the channel be included in the analogue and/or digital basic service, making it available to all subscribers of that TV service provider. A channel subject to such an order, particularly those subject to mandatory carriage on the basic service, is sometimes known as an 9(1)(h) service.

A 9(1)(h) order may be applied to specialty channels, licensed television networks, or other types of CRTC-licensed television services. Designation as a 9(1)(h) service is independent of the Category A, B, and C designations applied to specialty channels, though in most cases, specialty channels subject to 9(1)(h) orders are also Category A services.

Background

Section 9(1)(h) of Canada's Broadcasting Act states:

9. (1) Subject to this Part, the Commission may, in furtherance of its objects, [...]

(h) require any licensee who is authorized to carry on a distribution undertaking to carry, on such terms and conditions as the Commission deems appropriate, programming services specified by the Commission.

The CRTC uses the powers granted by this section to issue mandatory distribution orders, which compels all Canadian television service providers to make specified television channels available to their subscribers, sometimes subject to various conditions (such as region or packaging). Most of these orders relate to channels that must be carried on analogue and/or digital basic services; in these cases, the orders also mandate per-subscriber wholesale rates to be paid to the operators of each of these channels.

In its 2013 review of applications for mandatory carriage under 9(1)(h), the CRTC stated that it only approves mandatory carriage for channels which "make exceptional contributions to meeting the objectives of the [Broadcasting] Act. These objectives notably include reflecting the ethno-cultural and linguistic diversity of Canada, including the special place of Aboriginal peoples in Canadian society and the needs of official language minority communities; allowing Canadians living with disabilities to participate more fully in the Canadian broadcasting system; and supporting Canada’s democratic life and institutions and its regions, including the North."

The Canadian Broadcasting Corporation's broadcast television networks, CBC Television and Ici Radio-Canada Télé, are also required to be carried in the basic package of all television providers nationwide. Local service providers are also required to offer any local television stations with over-the-air coverage in their service area, as well as the designated provincial education channel(s) and/or legislature channel, if applicable. However, these requirements are codified in the CRTC's Broadcast Distribution Regulations, and are not subject to an explicit mandatory-carriage order. Specialty channels owned by the CBC are not subject to mandatory carriage under the Broadcast Distribution Regulations, but may be subject to 9(1)(h) orders, and to the mandatory distribution rules for all specialty channels.

Current services

Mandatory carriage (must-carry)

Mandatory distribution (must-offer)

Note that Category A services are also considered "must-offer" services under the Broadcast Distribution Regulations for services in the majority language of the market where the provider operates, and in all cases for satellite providers, and thus do not require a separate 9(1)(h) order. (The 9(1)(h) order for Ici ARTV, a French-language Category A service, only relates to its carriage in anglophone markets, which is not mandatory under those regulations.)

Former services 
 Sun News Network – Like other national news channels, it was subject to the same mandatory distribution order as the other national news channels (inclusion in "the best available discretionary package consistent with their genre and programming") from March 2014 until the channel's shutdown on February 13, 2015.

References

Canadian Radio-television and Telecommunications Commission
Cable television in Canada